Arbre may refer to:
 Arbre, Ath, a commune in Ath, Belgium
 , a village in Profondeville, Belgium
 Arbre, a planet in Anathem by Neal Stephenson

See also
  or liberty trees, a symbol of the French Revolution
 Arbre du Ténéré, once considered the most isolated tree on Earth
 Arbre Magique, a line of disposable air fresheners
 L'arbre de ciència or Tree of Science, a 1295 encyclopedia by Ramon Llull
 , a 1996 song written by Philippe Tatartcheff and Anna McGarrigle
 , a 2007 song by French singer Yannick Noah